John II, "The Babymaker", Duke of Cleves, Count of Mark, (German: Johann II. "der Kindermacher", Herzog von Kleve, Graf von Mark) (13 April 1458 – 15 March 1521) was a son of John I, Duke of Cleves and Elizabeth of Nevers. He ruled Cleves from 1481 to his death in 1521. He was called "The Babymaker" as he had fathered sixty-three illegitimate children  prior to his marriage with Mathilde of Hesse in 1489, who was the daughter of Henry III, Landgrave of Upper Hesse and his wife Anna of Katzenelnbogen.

They had three children :
 John III (1490–1539), his successor
 Anna (1495–1567), married in 1518 with count Philip III of Waldeck-Eisenberg
 Adolf (1498–1525), appointed by his father's cousin Philip of Cleves, Lord of Ravenstein and Wijnendale, as his successor, but died before Philip (1528)

Ancestry

References

Sources

External links
 Genealogy of Jülich-Cleves Accessed July 28, 2008

Dukes of Cleves
House of La Marck
1458 births
1521 deaths
Counts of the Mark